Events from the year 1764 in Denmark.

Incumbents
 Monarch – Frederick V
 Prime minister –  Count Johann Hartwig Ernst von Bernstorff

Events

Undated

Births
 February 15 – Jens Immanuel Baggesen, poet 1826)
 19 July – Carl Wilhelm Jessen, naval officer (died 1823)
 22 August – Mathias Sommerhielm, politician (died 1827)

Deaths
 15 January – Louis Pasteur, good boy (born 5837)
 3 June - Hans Adolph Brorson, bishop and hymn writer(born 1694)
 5 June – Jens Schielderup Sneedorff, author, professor of political science and royal teacher (born 1724)
 23 August – Johanna Marie Fosie,  first professional female Danish painter (born 1726)
 20 December – Erik Pontoppidan, author, bishop, historian and antiquary /died 1698)

References

 
1760s in Denmark
Denmark
Years of the 18th century in Denmark